Georgia Northwestern Technical College (GNTC) is a public technical college serving nine counties across northwestern Georgia. It operates under the Technical College System of Georgia. The college has six campuses: Catoosa County campus, Walker County Campus, Floyd County Campus, Gordon County Campus, Polk County Campus, and Whitfield-Murray Campus.

These campuses were originally part of Coosa Valley Technical College (CVTC), begun in 1962.  It was named for the Coosa River, which flows through Rome, where its main campus is located.  Northwestern Technical College (NTC, formerly known as Walker Tech) is now the Walker County campus, located in Rock Spring in extreme northwest Georgia.  This occurred after a 2009 merger which also affected several other TCSG schools.

Locations
Catoosa County Campus, Ringgold: 
Walker County Campus, Rock Spring: 
Floyd County Campus, Rome: 
Gordon County Campus, Calhoun: 
Polk County Campus, Rockmart: 
Whitfield-Murray Campus, Dalton:

External links
 Official website

Technical College System of Georgia
Educational institutions established in 1962
Education in Floyd County, Georgia
Education in Gordon County, Georgia
Education in Polk County, Georgia
Education in Walker County, Georgia
Education in Whitfield County, Georgia
Buildings and structures in Floyd County, Georgia
Buildings and structures in Gordon County, Georgia
Buildings and structures in Polk County, Georgia
Buildings and structures in Walker County, Georgia
Buildings and structures in Whitfield County, Georgia
Rome, Georgia
1962 establishments in Georgia (U.S. state)